Mystery Case Files: MillionHeir is a puzzle adventure video game developed by Big Fish Games and Griptonite Games and published by Nintendo, for the Nintendo DS. It was released in North America and Australia in 2008, and Europe in 2009. It is the second Mystery Case Files game to be made for a portable device.

Gameplay 

Apart from its single-player mode, the game has cooperative and multiplayer options when players have multiple copies of the game.

Reception 

The game received "mixed" reviews, according to video game review aggregator Metacritic.

IGN Daemon Hatfield wrote that the game lacked personality but was fun as a limited activity. He felt that its "seek-and-find" gameplay would have tired quickly after much longer. Hatfield said that the game took full advantage of the Nintendo DS's unique features. He also praised the game's details, particularly the sound design, which he felt made the game world more enveloping. Hatfield gave the game a rating of 7.7/10.

References

External links
 Official site

2008 video games
Adventure games
Big Fish Games games
Nintendo DS games
Nintendo DS-only games
Puzzle video games
Griptonite Games
Hidden object games
Touch! Generations
Casual games
Video games developed in the United States
Multiplayer and single-player video games
Cooperative video games
Nintendo games